Jotaučiai Manor was a former residential manor in Jotaučiai village, Utena District Municipality, Lithuania.

References

Manor houses in Lithuania